Khanty-Mansiysky District  is an administrative and municipal district (raion), one of the nine in Khanty-Mansi Autonomous Okrug, Russia. It is located in the center of the autonomous okrug. Its administrative center is the town of Khanty-Mansiysk (which is not administratively a part of the district). As of the 2010 Census, the total population of the district was 19,362.

Administrative and municipal status
Within the framework of administrative divisions, Khanty-Mansiysky District is one of the nine in the autonomous okrug. The town of Khanty-Mansiysk serves as its administrative center, despite being incorporated separately as a town of okrug significance—an administrative unit with the status equal to that of the districts.

As a municipal division, the district is incorporated as Khanty-Mansiysky Municipal District. The town of okrug significance of Khanty-Mansiysk is incorporated separately from the district as Khanty-Mansiysk Urban Okrug.

References

Notes

Sources

Districts of Khanty-Mansi Autonomous Okrug
